This is a list of Billboard magazine's Top Hot 100 songs of 1979. The Top 100, as revealed in the year-end edition of Billboard dated December 22, 1979.

See also
 1979 in music
 List of Billboard Hot 100 number-one singles of 1979
 List of Billboard Hot 100 top-ten singles in 1979

References

1979 record charts
Billboard charts